The Old Reader is a web-based news aggregator that delivers website, blog, and other Internet content to a web-based inbox. The service sprung up when Google removed social features from Google Reader; the site supports social media sharing, including the ability to "like" content, and find friends via social media networks.

History
The Old Reader was started as a hobby project by Olena Bulygina, Dmitry Krasnoukhov, and Anton Tolchanov. In March 2013, it had only 10,000 users, but it started gaining popularity quickly after Google announced that month that it would retire Google Reader. By the end of April 2013, the project already had 200,000 users and Anton had to quit, leaving just Elena and Dmitry.

In August 2013, a month after Google Reader was shut down, two remaining co-founders were struggling to keep The Old Reader running in the face of a large influx of new users. On July 29, The Old Reader team stated they had 420,000 registered users, with as many as 60,000 registrations in a single day. The team announced their intention to close the public version of the reader, leaving only a private website for a limited number of people. However, a few days later, another announcement stated that the website will remain public, with support from an unnamed "corporate entity in the United States". In November 2013, the team mentioned that the new owner was Levee Labs.

The new team invested in hardware upgrade and changed the hosting provider, implemented a number of new features, including long-awaited browser bookmarklet. The founders of the site had publicly rejected ad-based tactics to support the service; the new team shares their vision, and in order to finance operations for the otherwise free application introduced a Premium service in February 2014.

Features
The Old Reader is free for up to 100 feeds and offers a Premium version with full-text search and up to 500 subscriptions and 1 year of post storage. Former users of Google Reader or other RSS readers can import feeds via OPML export. A browser bookmarklet lets users send web pages directly to The Old Reader account.

The service is integrated with Facebook or Google to help users find friends also using the site. There is also support for Readability, Instapaper, and Spritz, a service to help read content faster.

Mobile applications
The Old Reader has made its mobile API freely available to facilitate support for mobile applications. The service is supported by a number of mobile applications for all major platforms, including Reeder and Feeddler for iOS, Greader for Android (no longer available as of 2018),  Old Reader for Windows Phone and ThOR for Symbian.

Reception
The Old Reader's reception was generally positive. PC Magazine praised its simple design and social aspects, but noted it lacked some of the features of its competitors. Dave Winer, one of the creators of RSS and other technology pundits have praised The Old Reader team's commitment to open web standards and delivering ad-free services, although as of 17 March 2015 the service includes "sponsored posts" inline with aggregated content.

See also
Comparison of feed aggregators
RSS Reader
Feedly
Digg Reader
NewsBlur

References

External links
 Status page of The Old Reader
 Official blog
 List of supporting apps

News aggregators
IOS software
Android (operating system) software
Web software